Vanity is the fourth full-length studio album, and seventh overall release, by American metalcore band Eighteen Visions. It was their first album to feature a music video, which was for "You Broke Like Glass". It was the last album to feature guitarist Brandan Schieppati as he left immediately after the recording of the album to focus on Bleeding Through. The band toured for the album with a single guitarist, Keith Barney. As of 2007, the album has sold over 100,000 copies in the United States.

Most critics and fans consider Vanity to be their final metalcore album, the band moving towards a more post-hardcore sound after this. It should however be noted that the band considered this change to have begun prior to this album, with the recording of "Motionless and White" which was featured on The Best of Eighteen Visions the year before. Hart's improved vocal style lead the band to write more melodic song structure rather than their previous technical metalcore compositions.

Album versions 
To promote the release of the album, Trustkill also issued a 7" single, which included the title track, "Vanity", and the then considered single "I Don't Mind". The 7" was pressed in quantities of 1,000 each on red and white, and 200 on pink. Good Life Recordings also released a 12" pictured vinyl limited to 1,000 copies.

The album was re-issued on January 25, 2005 as part of Trustkill Records re-issue calendar (which also saw Bleeding Through's This Is Love, This Is Murderous get the same treatment simultaneously). It featured new artwork and the album now had an enhanced video section which included the music video for "You Broke Like Glass", the only single from the album. This also provided a chance for the track listing to be fixed, as the song "There is Always" was left off on the original CD covers of the album. It should, however, be noted that the picture LP released by Good Life does not feature the listing of either "interludes" on the album, "The Notes of My Reflection" and "There is Always". The possibilities that "The Notes of My Reflection" was actually mistakenly left on the track listing is often wondered. Nevertheless, both interludes are listed on the reissues' track listing.

The album was once again re-issued in 2020 on a hot pink/baby pink pressing limited to 100 copies and a hot-pink/transparent pressing limited to 200. These re-issues sold out in only a few hours, leading the band to do two more pressings, one being a splattered hot pink and blue/transparent, which was limited to 100 pressings, and a baby-blue/baby-pink pressing that was limited to 150 pressings.

Film references 
As with most records by Eighteen Visions, there are a multitude of film quotes and references within the album. Until the band's comeback release XVIII, Vanity was the final album to feature audio samples from films, possibly due to the fact that the band's following two albums would be co-distributed by Sony.

 The sample in the intro from "One Hell of a Prize Fighter" is taken from the 1985 film River's Edge.
 The sample in the intro from "The Critic" is taken from the 1982 film Fast Times At Ridgemont High.
 The song title "Sonic Death Monkey" is taken from a fictitious band in the 2000 film High Fidelity.
 The entire sample throughout "There is Always" is actually the theme song from the 1962 film The Manchurian Candidate, although original composer David Amram is uncredited, and the band members claimed songwriting credits on their ASCAP publishing registration.

Track listing 
 "Vanity" – 5:46
 "Fashion Show" – 4:13
 "One Hell of a Prize Fighter" – 5:14
 "I Don't Mind" – 4:38
 "The Notes of My Reflection" – 1:36
 "A Short Walk Down a Long Hallway" – 4:17
 "The Critic" – 4:19
 "Gorgeous" – 2:52
 "You Broke Like Glass" – 3:08
 "In the Closet" – 3:16
 "Sonic Death Monkey" – 5:21
 "There is Always" – 1:41
 "Love in Autumn" – 13:33

"Love in Autumn" ends at 5:10 followed by silence until 12:23, at which point a phone conversation fades in which leads to the end of the track.

Personnel 
Credits are adapted from the album's liner notes.

Eighteen Visions
James Hart – lead vocals
Keith Barney – guitar, backing vocals
Brandan Schieppati – guitar
Mick Morris – bass guitar
Ken Floyd – drums; guitar and vocals on "Gorgeous"

Guest musicians
Howard Jones – additional vocals on "One Hell of a Prize Fighter"
Corey Darst – additional vocals on "A Short Walk Down a Long Hallway"
Alex Vaz – additional vocals on "The Critic"
Ryan J. Downey – additional vocals on "Sonic Death Monkey"

Production
John Lacroix – design and layout
Greg Koller – recording engineer and producer at F1 Studios

References 

Eighteen Visions albums
2002 albums
Trustkill Records albums
Good Life Recordings albums